John Arthur Eaves Sr. (July 31, 1935 – March 18, 2022) was an American lawyer and politician. A Democrat, he served one term in the Mississippi House of Representatives from 1972 to 1976 and made three unsuccessful bids for gubernatorial office in 1975, 1979, and 1987.

Early life 
John Arthur Eaves was born on July 31, 1935, in Louisville, Mississippi. He graduated from Louisville High School in 1954 and Mississippi State University in 1959 with a degree in geology. He subsequently joined the U.S. Army, reaching the rank of sergeant and serving as a judge advocate in the Judge Advocate General's Corps before obtaining a Bachelor of Laws and a Juris Doctor from the University of Mississippi School of Law. He married Patricia Lovorn on August 23, 1963, and had three children with her: John Arthur Jr., Paige, and Tiffany. He began practicing law in Jackson, Mississippi, in 1963 and established a reputation as a successful trial lawyer.

Political career 
A Democrat, Eaves served one term in the Mississippi House of Representatives from 1972 to 1976, representing the 31st District. Eaves mounted his first gubernatorial bid in 1975, finishing fourth in the Democratic primary with 50,606 votes. In 1979 he ran again, placing third in the primary with 143,411 votes. He launched his final campaign in 1987, finishing fourth with 98,517 votes.

Later life 
Eaves died on March 18, 2022, at the Mississippi Baptist Medical Center in Jackson, succumbing to cancer.

References

Works cited 
 

1935 births
2022 deaths
Democratic Party members of the Mississippi House of Representatives
Lawyers from Jackson, Mississippi
United States Army Judge Advocate General's Corps